Changy is a commune in the Marne department in north-eastern France.

Geography
The village lies in the southern part of the commune, above the right bank of the Chée, which forms most of its south-eastern border.

See also
Communes of the Marne department

References

Communes of Marne (department)